Just Pals is a 1920 American silent Western film directed by John Ford, and was Ford's first film for Fox Film Corporation. John Ford is credited as 'Jack Ford', as was typical for his earliest films.

The film introduces the theme of the partnership between two vagabonds, a young man and a boy, who support and help each other. Buck Jones and Georgie Stone already anticipates some of the elements that will contribute to the extraordinary success of Charles Chaplin and Jackie Coogan in The Kid (1921). The sheriff in the film, played by Duke R. Lee, keeps saying five times in the film, "The law'll take care o' this!".

Plot
The town bum, Bim (Buck Jones), rescues Bill, (Georgie Stone) thrown off a train by brakeman (Bert Appling).   Bim gives Bill a bath and promises Mary (Helen Ferguston) to take Bim to school.  Bill steals a uniform so Bim can get a job but gets hurt jumping off the train.   Bim takes him to the town Doctor (Edwin Tilton) where his wife (Eunice Murdock) discovers Bill may be a runaway with a reward.   They plot to keep Bill away from Bim.  Mary is wooed by Harvey Cahill (William Buckley).   Next, the townspeople come to her for the memorial fund and she gives Bim a note to get the fund from Harvey.   Mary supposedly sees a boy drowning some kittens and faints.   Bim sees Mary being carried to the doctor, reads the note and confronts Harvey who gives him the money he has stolen.   The town sheriff (Duke R Lee) opens the safe to find the money missing.  Bim is arrested for returning the money but escapes with Bill.   Bim and Bill meet up with outlaws planning to rob the town bank.   Bim tries to stop them but the outlaws tie them up.   Nearby a car roars down a hill, the driver is thrown out.   A boy comes out, frees them and they pursue the outlaws into town.   Bim catches them robbing the bank, the towns people catch them.   Outlaw (Slim Padgell) claims Bim is one of them and Bim is tied up.   Harvey attempts to escape with Mary while Bill tells the sheriff he is the real villain.   A rich man appears claiming to be Bill’s father but upon seeing him says he isn’t.   The boy from the car turns out to be the man’s son and Bim gets a reward for rescuing him.    Harvey is unmasked as the chauffeur who kidnapped the boy and is arrested.   Bim and Bill, dressed in suits show up at Mary’s house.  Bim stumbles through a proposal and they walk off.

Cast
 Buck Jones as Bim
 Helen Ferguson as Mary Bruce
 Georgie Stone as Bill
 Duke R. Lee as Sheriff
 William Buckley as Harvey Cahill
 Eunice Murdock Moore as Mrs. Stone
 Bert Appling as Brakeman
 Edwin B. Tilton as Dr. Stone (credited as Edwin Booth Tilton)
 Slim Padgett as Outlaw

References

External links

 
 
 

1920 films
1920 Western (genre) films
American black-and-white films
Films directed by John Ford
Fox Film films
Articles containing video clips
Silent American Western (genre) films
1920s American films